Louis Szanto (October 8, 1889 – March 15, 1965) was a Hungarian-American painter. His work was part of the painting event in the art competition at the 1936 Summer Olympics.

References

1889 births
1965 deaths
20th-century American painters
American male painters
Olympic competitors in art competitions
People from Vác
20th-century American male artists
Hungarian emigrants to the United States